Andrew Rowe (born January 22, 1988) is an American professional ice hockey forward. He is currently playing for SC Rapperswil-Jona Lakers of the Swiss National League (NL).

Playing career
Rowe played NCAA college hockey with Michigan State University scoring 49 points in 94 games. On May 7, 2010, Rowe signed a professional contract with the Philadelphia Flyers organization, and he was assigned to start the 2010–11 season in the American Hockey League with the Adirondack Phantoms.

He started the 2013-14 with the Greenville Road Warriors of the ECHL but was promoted to the Hartford Wolf Pack of the American Hockey League after scoring three goals with one assist in his first two games for Greenville.

On September 5, 2014, the South Carolina Stingrays of the ECHL announced that they had signed Rowe to a one-year contract.

On July 2, 2015, Rowe secured an AHL contract, agreeing to a one-year deal with the Bridgeport Sound Tigers.

After recording his best statistical season with the Sound Tigers in the 2016–17 campaign with 36 points in 66 games, Rowe signed his first European contract in securing a one-year contract with Swedish top-tier club, Mora IK of the Swedish Hockey League (SHL), on June 3, 2017.

Career statistics

References

External links

1988 births
Living people
Adirondack Phantoms players
American men's ice hockey forwards
Bridgeport Sound Tigers players
Charlotte Checkers (2010–) players
Elmira Jackals (ECHL) players
Greenville Road Warriors players
Hartford Wolf Pack players
Ice hockey players from Michigan
Michigan State Spartans men's ice hockey players
Mora IK players
Norfolk Admirals players
People from Spring Lake, Michigan
SC Rapperswil-Jona Lakers players
Sioux City Musketeers players
South Carolina Stingrays players